Radkov is a Slavic masculine surname; its feminine counterpart is Radkova. Prominent people with it include:
Alexander Radkov (born 1951), Belarusian politician
Artem Radkov (born 1985), Belarusian football player
Daniela Radkova, Bulgarian folk singer, sister of Lyudmila
Kostadinka Radkova (born 1962), Bulgarian basketball player
Krasimir Radkov (born 1971), Bulgarian comedian
Lyudmila Radkova, Bulgarian folk singer, sister of Daniela